Double O  is a letter of the Cyrillic script. The Cyrillic "double O" looks similar to the Latin-script double-o ligature: .

Computing encodings

References